Sawla-Tuna-Kalba is one of the constituencies represented in the Parliament of Ghana. It elects one Member of Parliament (MP) by the first past the post system of election. It is located in the Savannah Region of Ghana. The current member of Parliament for the constituency is Donald Dari Saditey. He was elected on the ticket of the National Democratic Congress (NDC) and  won a majority of 4,222  votes more than candidate closest in the race, to win the constituency election to become the MP. He had earlier represented the constituency in the 4th Republican parliament.

See also
List of Ghana Parliament constituencies

References 

Parliamentary constituencies in the Savannah Region